Louis van der Westhuizen (born 25 February 1995) is a Namibian rugby union player. He was named in Namibia's squad for the 2015 Rugby World Cup. His usual position is hooker.

References

1995 births
Living people
Namibian rugby union players
Namibia international rugby union players
Place of birth missing (living people)
White Namibian people
Namibian Afrikaner people
People educated at Windhoek High School
Leopards (rugby union) players
Welwitschias players
Bulls (rugby union) players
Cheetahs (rugby union) players
Free State Cheetahs players
Rugby union hookers